An agal (also spelled iqal, egal, or igal) is an Arab men's clothing accessory. It is a black cord, worn doubled, used to keep a ghutrah in place on the wearer's head. It is traditionally made of goat hair.

It is traditionally worn by Arabs from the Arabian Peninsula, Iraq, Jordan, parts of Egypt, Palestine and Syria (such as the Negev in Israel, Deir ez-Zor and Hauran in Syria, and Sinai and Ash Sharqia in Egypt. The Agal is also worn by Ahwazi Arabs in Iran.

The use of the agal and ghutra is dated through antiquities including bas-reliefs and statues going back to ancient times. The agal is traced in Semitic and Middle Eastern civilizations based on old Babylon artifacts such as Elamite coins and figures and even in ancient Arabian kingdoms. In his book Iran In The Ancient East, the archaeologist and Elamologist Ernst Herzfeld, in referring to the Susa bas-reliefs, points to the ancient agal as unique headwear of Elamites that distinguished them from other nations.

See also
 Bisht
 Izar
 Litham
 Sirwal
 Taqiyah
 Thawb
Keffiyeh

References

Arabic clothing
Middle Eastern clothing
Headgear
Islamic male clothing